The João Valente Bank is a coral reef located between the islands of Boa Vista and Maio, Cape Verde. It stands on a seamount (guyot) about 100 meters under sea level, and rises up to 10 m below the surface. The seamount rises from about 1,000 meters. It is about 15 nmi long and 9 nmi wide, and breaking waves can already be observed at moderate wind. The reef has a high biodiversity of fish.

References

Reefs of Cape Verde